Saint Mark's Coptic Orthodox Church may refer to:

Egypt
 Saint Mark's Coptic Orthodox Cathedral, in Cairo, seat of the Coptic Orthodox Pope
 Saint Mark's Coptic Orthodox Cathedral (Alexandria)
 Saint Mark's Coptic Orthodox Cathedral, Azbakeya, Cairo
 Saint Mark Coptic Orthodox Church (Heliopolis)

United States
 St. Mark Coptic Orthodox Church (Los Angeles), California
 St. Mark Coptic Orthodox Church (Centennial, Colorado), in the Denver metropolitan area
 St. Mark Coptic Orthodox Church (Jersey City, New Jersey)

United Kingdom

 Saint Mark's Coptic Orthodox Church (London)

See also
 St. Mark's Church (disambiguation)
 Saint Mark's Cathedral (disambiguation)
 List of Coptic Orthodox Churches in Australia, including Oceania and East Asia
 List of Coptic Orthodox Churches in Canada
 List of Coptic Orthodox Churches in the United States